Scambos Glacier is a glacier about 35 nautical miles (60 km) long draining to the Sulzberger Ice Shelf. Named by Advisory Committee on Antarctic Names (US-ACAN) after Theodore A. Scambos, National Snow and Ice Data Center, Boulder, Colorado, expert in the use of remotely sensed data for field and theoretical studies of Antarctic ice behavior from the 1980s to the present.

References

Glaciers of Marie Byrd Land